Elsterwerdaer Platz is a surface level Berlin U-Bahn station located on the . It is named after the town of Elsterwerda. The station opened on 1 July, 1988 to serve the new development of Biesdorf and is near the village commons and the Biesdorf Center shopping mall (on B1). Until 1989, it was the eastern terminus of what is now line U5.

References

U5 (Berlin U-Bahn) stations
Buildings and structures in Marzahn-Hellersdorf
Railway stations in Germany opened in 1988
1988 establishments in East Germany